The Office of the Compliance Advisor/Ombudsman (CAO) is a recourse mechanism for projects supported by the International Finance Corporation (IFC) and Multilateral Investment Guarantee Agency (MIGA) of the World Bank Group. It was established in 1999 and is based in Washington, D.C.

Mission
The Mission of the CAO is to address complains of people affected by IFC and MIGA projects, and to improve the accountability of both institutions

References

External links
 

World Bank
Organizations established in 1999
Ombudsman organizations
Consumer organizations in the United States
1999 establishments in Washington, D.C.